The Computer and Communications Industry Association (CCIA) is an international non-profit advocacy organization based in Washington, DC, United States which represents the information and communications technology industries. According to their site, CCIA "promotes open markets, open systems, open networks, and full, fair, and open competition." Established in 1972, CCIA was active in antitrust cases involving IBM, AT&T and Microsoft, and lobbied for net neutrality, copyright and patent reform and against internet censorship and policies, mergers or other situations that would reduce competition. CCIA released a study it commissioned by an MIT professor, which analyzed the cost of patent trolls to the economy., a study on the economic benefits of Fair Use and has testified before the Senate on limiting government surveillance and on internet censorship as a trade issue.

Membership
CCIA members include a range of internet services companies to software to telecom companies such as Amazon, Apple Inc., BT Group, Cloudflare, Dish Network, eBay, Facebook, Google, Intel, Intuit, Mozilla, NordVPN, Rakuten, Red Hat, Samsung, Twitter, Uber and Yahoo!.

Issues

Internet freedom
The group has lobbied against Internet freedom on issues like the Stop Online Piracy Act and PROTECT IP Act, testified on Internet censorship as a human rights and trade issue and also lobbied on privacy issues including government surveillance by the US National Security Agency CCIA has also lobbied for net neutrality, filing comments with the FCC and amicus briefs in court so that no  company or government could discriminate against similar content. CCIA has lobbied to ensure patent litigation reform, including the Innovation Act, and provides the website Patent Progress, which is dedicated to patent issues. CCIA supported Section 230 when it passed in 1996 as it facilitated free speech online by giving companies some level of liability protection for both allowing the free speech and also removing some legal speech such as "hate speech" that may violate user agreements. Since then, CCIA has warned  against altering Section 230 as some in Congress sought to pressure social media companies with changes to the law.

Intellectual property 
Patents:
CCIA represents companies that hold patents and also rely on licensing patents from others to produce interoperable tech products. CCIA supports balanced intellectual property policies that support both patent holders and next generation innovation. It maintains a blog, Patent Progress, that covers issues like patent reform. CCIA filed an amicus brief in the Apple Samsung design patent case, which the court ultimately used in its ruling. The Supreme Court ended up agreeing a company should not gain another company's entire profits on a product over a design patent infringement issue. CCIA has been fighting for comprehensive patent reform for two decades and has issued statements supporting venue reform, as a fifth of the patent cases are ushered over to the Eastern District of Texas, which promotes itself as having procedures and juries that favor patent owners.

Copyright:
CCIA supports balancing copyright policy so that it incentivizes creators and also allows people to access information online. It has commissioned studies in the US and Europe that industries that rely on fair use and other copyright exceptions make up one-sixth of the GDP.
The tech trade association has warned about court rulings such as Europe's right to be forgotten, which some, including CCIA Vice President James Waterworth in Brussels, creates the ability for any EU citizen to "disappear" web search results. In a New York Times article, which also ran on CNBC, Waterworth said, "This ruling opens the door to large-scale private censorship in Europe. While the ruling likely means to offer protections, our concern is it could also be misused by politicians or others with something to hide."
CCIA has offered comments to USTR on how copyright has been used as a trade issue and

Privacy
CCIA has also been an outspoken critic of government surveillance without checks and balances. CCIA CEO Ed Black testified against FISA renewal before the Senate in 2007, saying better checks and balances were needed, and he testified again in 2013 after the Snowden revelations about the scope of NSA surveillance. In a Washington Diplomat article looking at the impact of the leaks one year later, Black expressed optimism that people will be better able to protect themselves in the future and he has called on Congress to pass legislation to allow companies to disclose the size and scope of government requests and for the government to end mass bulk data collection.

CCIA Europe
CCIA's four person Brussels office, established in 2010, is advocating for its members on issues before European regulators including copyright reform, the audiovisual services directive, the e-Privacy directive, the telecommunications proposal, data transfers, data localization, trade issues and other policies that support the digital economy. As Europe moves to a Digital Single Market, it has an opportunity to usher in policies that would boost its innovation economy and also the increasing number of traditional industries that rely on the internet to collaborate with colleagues and reach customers.

Amazon Prime
CCIA is currently lobbying against antitrust bills in the United States that threaten to break up Amazon Prime and other big technology corporations. The CCIA has also commissioned reports that criticize the American Innovation and Choice Online Act and other measures that would increase antitrust enforcement, particularly against tech firms.

References

External links
Official website

American advisory organizations
Information technology organizations based in North America